Agreia pratensis is a bacterium from the genus Agreia which has been isolated from groundwater from Finland.

References

Microbacteriaceae
Bacteria described in 2002